This article lists the aggressor squadrons of the United States Air Force. The purpose of aggressor squadrons is to prepare Air Force combat aircrews by providing challenging, realistic threat replication, training, test support, academics and feedback.

Aggressor squadrons

See also
List of United States Air Force squadrons

Aggressor